Casimir IV may refer to:

Casimir IV Jagiellon (1427–1492), Polish king
Casimir IV, Duke of Pomerania (1351–1377)